Panchenko is a common Ukrainian surname. It may refer to:
 Alexander Panchenko (1953–2009), Russian chess grandmaster
 Anastasia Panchenko (born 1990), Russian sprint canoer
 Danylo Panchenko (born 1973), Ukrainian luger
 Kirill Panchenko (born 1989), Russian footballer, son of Viktor
 Lyubov Panchenko (1938–2022), Ukrainian artist
 Nikolai Panchenko (1924–2005), Russian poet
 Viktor Panchenko (born 1963), Russian footballer
 Yuriy Panchenko (born 1959), Soviet-Ukrainian volleyball player

See also
 

Ukrainian-language surnames
Surnames of Ukrainian origin